The National Pensions Regulatory Authority is a Government of Ghana statutory agency responsible for the regulation and policy development of pensions administration in Ghana.

Current Board Members
Dr. Nii Kwaku Sowah - Chairman
Mr. Kofi Anokye Owusu-Darko - CEO
Ms. Frederica S. Illiasu  - Member
Mr. Benjamin Asumang - Member
Mr. Sampson Akuettey Nortey - Member
Mrs. Akofa E. Avorkliya - Member
Mr. Kwame Ofori Gyau - Member
Mr. Adu Anane Antwi - Member
Dr. Thomas Ango Bediako - Member
Dr. Yaw Baah - Member

Past Chief Executive Officers
Laud Senanu
Sam Pee Yalley

References

Ministries and Agencies of State of Ghana
Pension regulation
Regulation in Ghana